Aeronaves de Puerto Rico was a short-lived Puerto Rican airline company which operated from November of 1982 to 1983. The airline was  initially  certified to fly between Rafael Hernandez Airport in Aguadilla and the United States city of Newark, New Jersey. Later on,  flights were begun from Luis Munoz Marin International Airport in San Juan to John F. Kennedy International Airport in New York, New York, using a Boeing 707 jet.

The airline's trademark,  consisting of a local coqui frog inside a circle, was first filed on November 10, 1982.

An unsuccessful attempt at reviving Aeronaves  with the slightly changed name of "Aeronaves de P.R." was made during 2003, and the airline has not been revived since.

Destinations

Fleet
Boeing 707

See also
 Air Caribbean
 Caribair
 Culebra Air Services
 Dorado Wings
 Oceanair
 Prams Air
 Prinair
 Puertorriqueña de Aviación
 Vieques Air Link

Airlines with a similar name
 Aeronaves de México
 Aeronaves del Perú
 Aeronaves Dominicanas
 Aeronaves TSM

References

1982 establishments in Puerto Rico
1983 disestablishments in Puerto Rico
Defunct airlines of Puerto Rico
Airlines of Puerto Rico
Puerto Rican brands